Tepee Buttes is a mountain range in McKenzie County, North Dakota, in the United States.

Tepee Buttes was so named on account of its outline being shaped like a tepee.

References

Landforms of McKenzie County, North Dakota
Mountains of North Dakota